The Robert Moses Causeway is an  parkway in Suffolk County, New York on Long Island. It is named for the master builder and urban planner Robert Moses.  The parkway, originally known as the Captree Causeway, connects West Islip on Long Island to the barrier beach islands, such as Captree Island, Jones Beach Island, and the western tip of Fire Island, to the south. It is designated New York State Route 908J (NY 908J), an unsigned reference route. Except south of NY 27A, the road, like most parkways in New York State, is limited to non-commercial traffic.

Route description

The Robert Moses Causeway begins inside Robert Moses State Park, located on the western tip of Fire Island. From here, the highway heads north across the Fire Island Inlet on the Fire Island Inlet Bridge. On the north side of the inlet, the road changes from a two-lane undivided highway into a four-lane undivided highway as it enters Captree State Park and approaches a cloverleaf interchange with Ocean Parkway. The parkway becomes a five-lane divided highway with three northbound lanes and two southbound lanes in the vicinity of the junction.

The parkway then traverses the State Boat Channel Bridge by way of a -long bascule bridge modeled after the Mill Basin Drawbridge in Mill Basin, Brooklyn. The north foot of the bridge contains an unnumbered interchange to a private road on Captree Island, where the rest of the road is surrounded by protected land. On the section that crosses over the Great South Bay, via the Great South Bay Bridge, the New York City skyline can be faintly seen on a clear day. Originally a toll bridge, the remnants of the former toll plaza for the Great South Bay Bridge can be found on the north side in West Islip. At the cloverleaf interchange with NY 27A, the third northbound lane becomes the deceleration ramp, and from there the rest of the parkway is four lanes wide.

The parkway soon takes a slight northeastern turn and later rises to move over Union Boulevard (County Route 50 or CR 50), the Montauk Branch of the Long Island Rail Road, and Orinoco Drive with no access to either roads. Instead, another cloverleaf interchange is available at NY 27. The road remains elevated as it crosses over Muncey Road and then runs along the west side of Casamento Park, before approaching its northern terminus at the interchange with the Southern State Parkway. The north-to-eastbound ramp to the Southern State and Heckscher State parkways contains an interchange of its own with CR 57 (Bay Shore Road), because that ramp's traffic misses the Southern State Parkway exit to CR 57. The other ramps exist on a partial cloverleaf just west of Bay Shore Road's interchange with the Southern State.

History
The first sprawling trestle crossing from West Islip to Captree Island was completed in 1951. Originally, one lane was for southbound traffic and the other for northbound traffic. In a bridge opening ceremony, the first car to drive over the bridge was a Suffolk County Sheriff's Office patrol vehicle. In 1967, a new span was built next to the original bridge, carrying three lanes of northbound traffic. The original bridge was reconfigured to carry southbound traffic.

The Fire Island Inlet span was completed in 1964. By 1985 a dual span was proposed to alleviate traffic, but it was never constructed. When first proposed in 1938, the span was to be a vertical-lift bridge with a design similar to that of the Marine Parkway–Gil Hodges Memorial Bridge. Later, the design of the Fire Island Bridge was changed to conform with that of the Great South Bay span, a  steel-arch span with a  clearance.

Exit list
All exits south of the Great South Bay Bridge are unnumbered.

References

External links

 Robert Moses Causeway Article from NYCROADS Web Site
 Interchange of the Week; Monday, March 19, 2001 (Empire State Roads)
 Captree State Park 
 Robert Moses State Park
 Robert Moses Causeway (Greater New York Roads)

Parkways in New York (state)
Roads on Long Island
Robert Moses projects
Transportation in Suffolk County, New York
Former toll roads in New York (state)
Former toll bridges in New York (state)
Bascule bridges in the United States
Trestle bridges in the United States
Road bridges in New York (state)
Bridges in Suffolk County, New York